Lee Jong-wook (Hangul: 이종욱; Hanja: 李鍾旭; born June 18, 1980) is a South Korean outfielder who plays for the Doosan Bears in the Korean professional baseball league.

Professional career 
In , he joined the Hyundai Unicorns after graduating from Youngnam University in Daegu. However, he did not play any games since he joined the military service in December of that year.

In , when he was discharged from the military, he joined the Doosan Bears as a trainee. At that time, he tried to practice and develop his skill. At last, The Doosan's Head coach Kim Kyung-Moon selected him and Lee tried to survive, not to lose the opportunity. As a result, he could settle down the major group of Bears.

In Summer Olympic Games 2008, Lee contributed to win the gold medal for his national team. In the team's first game of round-robin play against the United States, he hit the game-winning sacrifice fly to score Lee Taek-Keun in the bottom of the 9th inning.

His biggest advantage was to run fast. Therefore, he made fifty-one steals in that season even though his team failed to join the post-season in 2006. Next year, he made forty-seven steals while he hit a homer and made a 0.316 hitting average. He can run to the third base if he hit a ball to the further course of a stadium. He can steal to the second or third base in any situation even a good pitcher marks tightly or a catcher throws a ball exactly. In addition, he can catch a flying ball which drops into the point in which any outfielder get hardly or miss.

Especially he made 0.517 hitting average and three SBs in playoffs 2008. And won the Most Valuable Player straight two years in 2007 and 2008 playoff of two post-seasons.

Awards and honors
2007 Golden Glove Award (Outfielder)
2008 Golden Glove Award (Outfielder)
2010 Golden Glove Award (Outfielder)

Achievements
2006 Stolen Bases Title
2008 Runs Leader

Career statistics

Bold = led KBO

References

External links

2009 World Baseball Classic players
Baseball players at the 2008 Summer Olympics
Olympic gold medalists for South Korea
Olympic baseball players of South Korea
Hyundai Unicorns players
Doosan Bears players
NC Dinos players
KBO League center fielders
South Korean baseball players
1980 births
Living people
Asian Games medalists in baseball
Olympic medalists in baseball
Medalists at the 2008 Summer Olympics
Baseball players at the 2010 Asian Games
Yeungnam University alumni
Asian Games gold medalists for South Korea
Medalists at the 2010 Asian Games